"Je Souhaite" is the twenty-first episode of the seventh season of the science fiction television series The X-Files. It premiered on the Fox network in the United States on May 14, 2000. It was written and directed by Vince Gilligan. The episode is a "Monster-of-the-Week" story, unconnected to the series' wider mythology. "Je Souhaite" earned a Nielsen household rating of 8.2, being watched by 12.79 million people in its initial broadcast, and received mostly positive reviews from critics. The title means "I Wish" in French.

The show centers on FBI special agents Fox Mulder (David Duchovny) and Dana Scully (Gillian Anderson) who work on cases linked to the paranormal, called X-Files. Mulder is a believer in the paranormal, while the skeptical Scully has been assigned to debunk his work. In this episode, Mulder and Scully encounter a man and his physically disabled brother who lead the agents to an indifferent genie whose willingness to grant wishes belies a deeper motive.

Gilligan had written and helped produce earlier episodes of The X-Files, but "Je Souhaite" was his directorial debut. Originally, the script was supposed to be a "stark and scary" story, but Gilligan changed it to a humorous tale about a genie. The episode featured several elaborate "genie effects" that were created through digital technology; this included manipulating stock footage of former American President Richard Nixon and Italian dictator Benito Mussolini. One scene in the episode required the producers to block off eight blocks of downtown Los Angeles.

Plot
In St. Louis, Anson Stokes, an apathetic employee at a self storage facility, is yelled at by his boss to clean out an old and dusty storage locker. To his surprise, he finds a woman wrapped in a rug. His boss comes to check on him; while he is yelling for Anson, his mouth disappears. FBI agents Fox Mulder (David Duchovny) and Dana Scully (Gillian Anderson) speak with the boss, Jay Gilmore, after surgery to fix his mouth, which has left him disfigured and with a speech impediment. They question Stokes' brother Leslie at their mobile home, which inexplicably has a large boat in its tiny front yard. The woman from the storage container is in the Stokes brothers' kitchen. Mulder and Scully search the container and find old antiques and a picture of the previous owner with the woman from the apartment.

The woman is revealed to be a genie. Stokes is angry that he wasted his first two wishes; Stokes had previously wished for his boss to stop talking (which caused Gilmore's mouth to disappear) and for a boat. The boat, however, was not placed in water and Stokes is still forced to pay taxes on it. The genie hints, in vain, that Anson should give his physically handicapped brother the ability to walk as his third wish. Instead, he wishes for the ability to turn invisible at will, but neglects to stipulate that his clothes also become invisible. Undiscouraged, Anson strips and turns invisible, only to be struck and killed by a truck as he crosses the road.

Scully does the autopsy on the invisible body by covering it in powder. Mulder, meanwhile, researches the owner of the container. He learns that the man in the picture was extremely wealthy and lucky for a short period, before he died with a giant oversized penis. Mulder believes the woman in the picture is responsible for everything, and determines she is a jinniyah, a female genie. Mulder goes to the Stokes residence and asks Leslie to hand her over, presuming her to be kept in a box. It turns out, however, that she is not in the box, but is within the rug that Stokes found back in the storage facility, where Mulder also finds pictures of the jinniyah next to Benito Mussolini in the 1930s and next to Richard Nixon in the 1960s, two men that had a lot of power and then lost it.

Leslie takes possession of the jinniyah and asks for his brother to be returned to life, neglecting to specify that he be in good health. Consequently Anson is returned, but in a decaying, post-autopsy zombie-like state, complete with injuries from the crash. Despite the jinniyah's warning, Leslie's second wish is for Anson to talk, which results in Anson screaming at the top of his lungs and telling his brother that he is cold. Back at the morgue, Scully finds the body has disappeared and Mulder suspects it is because of Leslie's wish. They go to the Stokes residence and arrive just as Leslie finally decides to wish for functional legs and Anson blows up the house trying to light the stove in an attempt to warm up. 

Mulder questions the jinniyah, who says she's 500 years old. According to her, she gained her powers after wishing for great power and long life from an efreet, an extremely powerful type of genie. She also says that Mulder unrolled her so he now has three wishes of his own. Mulder wishes for peace on earth and she wipes out the entire human population except for him. With his second wish, Mulder undoes his first wish. Mulder then writes down his third wish to be very specific. However, just before making the final wish, Scully helps Mulder realize that the power of a genie should not be used to force people to be good, and so he ultimately wishes for the jinniyah to be free.

Production

Writing and directing
The episode—whose title means "I wish" in French—was written and directed by long-time X-Files contributor Vince Gilligan. Gilligan noted that, "From the very beginning I always had the intention of directing an episode, but I kept putting it off because I figured I didn't know enough." As season seven neared its end, Gilligan decided to finally direct an episode, as he feared that it might be the show's last season. Initially, Gilligan's first script was a "stark and scary" outing for the show. He eventually changed his mind and submitted a more light-hearted story about a genie.

Gilligan soon approached Carter for feedback. Carter was impressed with the story, saying, "Vince had been playing around with somebody finding something in a storage locker. He played around with several different ideas and one day he came in with one idea of a genie and three wishes. The one thing I noticed right away was that the relationship between Mulder and the genie was very sweet." After finalizing his script, Gilligan began to worry that he had "painted himself in a corner": "I did not intend to write a hard episode to direct [...] But before I realize it, I was blowing up a trailer, having a truck hit an invisible man, and all sorts of genie effects. [...] I looked at all the people on the set [...] and thought, 'Oh man, I'm going to be exposed as an impostor.'" Luckily, the cast and crew helped the new director ease into his position.

Special effects
The scene that features Scully applying yellow powder to an invisible body made use of various digital techniques. The first shot of the scene used a blue head cast of Kevin Weisman, the actor who portrayed Stokes. Gillian Anderson then added the yellow dust onto the cast. The second shot used motion control in order to match the film up exactly with the previously shot scene. Anderson then attempted to match her movements so that, when the two strips of film were combined during the editing stage, they would create the illusion of one composite whole. Finally, various close-ups of the blue head cast were filmed, with the blue color being removed via chroma keying. Paul Rabwin later called the scene "very effective."

During the episode, Mulder shows Scully several bits of archival footage of Richard Nixon and Benito Mussolini that include footage of the genie. In order to create the Nixon scene, the production crew used a real clip of Nixon, his wife Pat, and his daughter Tricia Nixon Cox. The crew then cut a matte in order to replace certain parts, with Nixon's daughter being excised to make room for the genie. Paula Sorge, who played Jenn, was then blue screened and the subsequent shot was "dirtied up" to properly age the film. The scenes were then combined.

During the scene where Mulder wanders into a deserted city street, the production crew had to close off eight blocks of downtown Los Angeles. The only practical way of doing this was to shoot on a Sunday morning, when hardly anyone was out on the street. Filming the scene did not go as planned: a homeless person "walked right through the ... perfect take", according to producer Harry Bring. Luckily, the production crew was able to use digital technology to erase the man during post-production.

Broadcast and reception
"Je Souhaite" first aired in the United States on May 14, 2000. This episode earned a Nielsen rating of 8.2, with a 13 share, meaning that roughly 8.2 percent of all television-equipped households, and 13 percent of households watching television, were tuned in to the episode. It was viewed by 12.79 million viewers. The episode aired in the United Kingdom and Ireland on Sky1 on August 6, 2000, and received 0.72 million viewers, making it the fourth most watched episode that week. Fox promoted the episode with the tagline "Be careful what you wish for."

The episode received mostly positive reviews with one detractor. Emily VanDerWerff of The A.V. Club awarded the episode an "A−" and called it her "favorite episode of season seven" and that she wished that "it had been the series finale" for The X-Files. VanDerWerff argued that the episode possessed a "warmth and tenderness" that was missing from the following two seasons, after Duchovny left the series as a full-time star. She concluded that "the genius of 'Je Souhaite' lies in how it embraces the inherent weirdness of the world this show is set in." Rob Bricken from Topless Robot named "Je Souhaite" the second most funny X-Files episode, writing, "Best line: When Scully, ever the skeptic, begins trying to rationalize her examination of an invisible body, Mulder replies with an exasperated, 'Oh!' It's what most of us had been thinking for years about Scully's refusal to acknowledge all the strange crap she had seen."

Robert Shearman and Lars Pearson, in their book Wanting to Believe: A Critical Guide to The X-Files, Millennium & The Lone Gunmen, rated the episode five stars out of five. The two praised the writing and noted that "if ['Je Souhaite'] had been the final stand-alone episode of the series, as it so easily might have been, it'd have been nevertheless appropriate. [...] it marks the end of an era; it's a perfect note of bliss which the series will never be able to capture again. Paula Vitaris from Cinefantastique gave the episode a moderately positive review and awarded it two-and-a-half stars out of four. She called Paula Sorge "one of the best guest actors of the season" and praised her acting, noting that she delivers her lines "with snap, bite, and wonderful dark humor." Vitaris, however, did note that the episode "would have worked better if it had consisted of a half-hour encounter between Mulder, Scully, and Jenn, and she heavily criticized the stereotypical portrayal of the guest cast as a group of poor Southerners.

Not all reviews were positive. Kenneth Silber from Space.com wrote, "'Je Souhaite' offers a few laughs but little drama and no intellectual substance. The episode seems designed to stall for time while negotiations drag on over David Duchovny's contract and the series' future. X-Files viewers will wish for—and deserve—better material than this I Dream of Jeannie rehash."

Footnotes

Bibliography

External links

2000 American television episodes
Genies in television
Television episodes set in Missouri
Television episodes directed by Vince Gilligan
Television episodes written by Vince Gilligan
The X-Files (season 7) episodes
Fiction about invisibility